HMAS Toowoomba (J157/B251/A125), named for the city of Toowoomba, Queensland was one of 60 Bathurst-class corvettes constructed during World War II and one of 20 built on Admiralty order but manned by personnel of and later commissioned into the Royal Australian Navy (RAN). The ship later served in the Royal Netherlands Navy (RNN) as HNLMS Boeroe.

Design and construction

In 1938, the Australian Commonwealth Naval Board (ACNB) identified the need for a general purpose 'local defence vessel' capable of both anti-submarine and mine-warfare duties, while easy to construct and operate. Construction of the prototype  did not go ahead, but the plans were retained. The need for locally built 'all-rounder' vessels at the start of World War II saw the "Australian Minesweepers" (designated as such to hide their anti-submarine capability, but popularly referred to as "corvettes") approved in September 1939, with 60 constructed during the course of the war: 36 ordered by the RAN, 20 (including Toowoomba) ordered by the British Admiralty but manned and commissioned as RAN vessels, and 4 for the Royal Indian Navy.

Toowoomba was laid down by Walkers Limited at Maryborough, Queensland on 6 August 1940. She launched on 26 March 1941, in a ceremony presided over by Mrs. C. W. Lowther, the wife of a long serving employee of the shipyard. Toowoomba was commissioned on 9 October 1941.

Operational history

RAN
Toowoomba entered operational service immediately on commissioning. She was initially based in Sydney, and was tasked with convoy escort duties along the east coast of Australia until January 1942, when Toowoomba and two sister ships were ordered to Batavia. Toowoomba was in constant action over the next two months, and on 14 February was one of the last ships to enter Singapore Harbour before it was captured by the Japanese.

Retreating to Fremantle, Western Australia after the capture of Singapore, Toowoomba was repaired and recommenced convoy escort duties, this time on the west coast of Australia and with a new captain and crew, until assignment to the British Eastern Fleet on 23 November 1942. During this time, she was involved in escort and patrol duties across the Indian Ocean, reaching as far west as the Persian Gulf. On 22 November 1944, Toowoomba was assigned to the newly created British Pacific Fleet, and operated with the fleet until returning to Fremantle on 3 December 1944 for refit. The refit was completed in March 1945, and Toowoomba was assigned to escort and patrol duties between Australia and New Guinea until the end of hostilities.

Following the end of World War II, Toowoomba spent time in Hong Kong, performing minesweeping and hydrological survey duties. She returned to Australia in December 1945.

The corvette earned two battle honours for her wartime service, "Pacific 1942" and "Indian Ocean 1942–44".

RNLN
On 5 July 1946, Toowoomba decommissioned from RAN service and immediately commissioned into the Royal Netherlands Navy (RNLN). Renamed HNLMS Boeroe, she served with the RNLN until 1958.

Citations

References
Books

Journal and news articles

Bathurst-class corvettes of the Royal Australian Navy
Ships built in Queensland
1941 ships
World War II corvettes of Australia